The gender pay gap in the United States tech industry is the divergence in pay between men and women who work in areas such as software engineering. Despite applying for the same jobs at the same companies, women receive job offers that pay less than their male counterparts 63% of the time. In 2018, reports show that for every dollar the average man made, women only made 82 cents, and women from underrepresented communities earn even less. State legislatures have begun to take action to solve the gender pay gap with California leading the way, following Iceland's example. The gap does not affect women of all races equally, and discourages women, specifically those that are underrepresented minorities, from continuing to pursue opportunities in the technology industry. The wage gap in the tech industry is a result of a multitude of factors including lower initial offers and lack of negotiations. As the tech industry becomes more influential in the United States economy, it will be important that firms offer equal pay for equal for equal work and be intentional in constructing applicant pools that are more representative of the population at large. Companies such as Apple, Amazon, and Google have been proactive in attempting to rectify the pay gap and have begun committing financial resources to eliminate the gap. Reports in 2019 showed the pay gap narrowed to 3% after remaining at 4% for the previous two years.

Statistics 
The job search platform Hired.com conducted market research to determine the current statistics in regards to the pay gap in the tech industry. Within the United States, the tech industry's gender wage gap can in many ways be linked to original offer sheets that women are presented; women receive salary offers less than that of men 63% of the time. The distribution of offers is not equal with an average of 4% less for women than men, but some organizations offer up to 45% less. However, the result of the gap is not just implicit sexism imposed by men. It has been found that on 66% of occasions, women ask for less money than their male counterparts. Constructing employment systems in which employees must ask for their wages can lead to situations in which women are receiving less pay, despite the fact that they are completing the same job. The pay discrepancy continues to manifest itself as careers proceed, and once women begin making less than men, it continues throughout their careers. In one survey, women often found that their male peers were paid at a higher rate. Only 19% of men surveyed discovered that someone in the same position was paid more than themselves, whereas 54% of women have had the same discovery. The pay gap is different across industries within the tech industry, with women in tech finance experiencing the smallest gap at 7% and women in education technology experiencing the largest gap at 10%. The gap is also different in the primary tech cities in the United States (San Francisco, New York, Seattle, Los Angeles, and Boston). Of the primary technology cities in the United States, women in Seattle face the largest wage gap at 11%, and women in San Francisco face the smallest gap at 8%.

Other factors

Age 
The pay gap affects younger women the most and manifests itself with the largest pay gap amongst ages. Women under 25 earn 29% less than their male counterparts, but this percentage reduces to 5% for employees over the age of 50. The advent of the personal computer created more barriers to entry for women as the marketing of personal computers was primarily directed at young boys. This marketing strategy led to computers being associated with men, which played a role in associating computer-based jobs with men rather than women. Pervasive advertisements for personal computers aimed at boys and men helps to explain why women comprise only 23% of computer programmers.

Race 
The wage gap exists for women of all racial and ethnic backgrounds, but the size of the gap differs between different races. Among white, black, Asian, and Hispanic workers, Asian men and white women compare the most favorably to white men. Black and Hispanic women have the largest gap of any of the surveyed groups, which indicates that race plays an important role in the wage gap.

Currently, minorities are underrepresented in the interview process at 6%, and they receive lower salary offers. However, Hispanic and black men still receive higher offers than their female counterparts of the same race. Without considering the intersectionality of an individual, firms may correct for race or gender inequities at the expense of other circumstances. Correcting just for race may perpetuate situations in which black and Hispanic men continue to make more than their female counterparts, while correcting exclusively for gender may allow white women to earn more than all groups but Asian and white men. Corrections that avoid binaries can help to reduce siloed hiring practices that attempt to fix one issue at a time rather than a multifaceted approach.

Legislation

California Fair Pay Act
State legislatures are beginning to make strides to attempt to rectify the gender pay gap: “California passed a law in late 2017 that no longer allows employers to ask job applicants about their prior salary. Plus, the employers must give applicants a pay range for the job they are seeking, if requested.” As one of the states that is home to several of the world’s most influential technology companies, California has the potential to begin fixing the tech industry's gender pay gap. However, the law also states that employers are allowed to offer lower pay to different sexes if "the employer can show that any pay gap is justified by a factor other than sex, such as a system that determines pay based on quantity or quality of production or that resulted from differences in education, training or experience." California is attempting to make strides to rectify the gender pay gap, which will influence the technology industry, but there are gaps in the law. Implicit biases play a role in hiring and payment decisions so the language stating that pay can be different for "training or experience" may result in women being paid less because the biases could cause their experience to be valued as less significant than their male counterparts.

Icelandic Fair Pay Act 
Members of the tech industry have pointed to Iceland as an example of how to implement law that effectively pays women and men equally for the same positions in organizations. At the beginning of 2018 a law that was passed in 2017 went into place and "is believed to be the first of its kind in the world and covers bot the private and public sectors." Unequal pay has been illegal in Iceland since 1961, but new law shifts the proof of fair pay from employers to employees. Iceland has instituted laws in the past to attempt to rectify the pay gap, and despite having "the best track record on gender equality in the world," the laws had not been successful in creating equal pay for equal work. Companies with over 25 employees will be reviewed every three years to confirm that they are paying men and women equally for equal work, and if they are not in compliance they will receive daily fines until they have reached compliance. While the law is intended to fix specifically gender inequity the lawmakers believe that it can also be applied for other marginalized groups such as race and sexual orientation.

Gender-based pay disputes

Google 
In 2017, a spreadsheet was distributed amongst Google employees that details the discrepancy in pay between male and female employees. The spreadsheet details that the salary and bonuses paid out at all levels of the organization favor men. Tech companies have continued to garner more importance and sway in the economy of the United States, but despite 'open cultures' there is a growing fear that "Silicon Valley has established itself as the boys' club of the west, just like how Wall Street has established itself as the boys' club of the East." The spreadsheet that circulated around Google is incomplete because it only evaluates the salaries and bonuses of 1200 employees. The reported pay gap led to a lawsuit filed against Google claiming that women who work as engineers, managers, sales, and early childhood education positions are systematically paid less at the company. Google has been proactive in responding to the critiques and conducted a comprehensive audit of their organization to attempt to rectify the pay gap in the company. Their internal research concluded that 228 employees were underpaid and raised their compensation, which resulted in a $270,000 cost for Google.

Skepticism 
There are those that believe the gender wage gap is a myth, or is a result of factors that are not discriminatory. Skeptics of the wage gap claim that statistics are manipulated to present the data in a way that benefits the argument of a gender wage gap. Skeptics further assert that the gap is a result of women’s choice to not pursue jobs that pay the same rate as their male counterparts, which skews the data to create a bigger gap than actually exists. The gap is rationalized by highlighting that men choose more dangerous jobs or higher paying fields that allow for them to advance their earning potential. Research that disputes the existence of a gender pay gap also relies on the highlighting voluntary choices to show that women are earning less as a function of their lack of exploring jobs that will see them make the same as their male counterparts. Skeptics also feel it is not the job of employers to create representative hiring pools. Skeptics acknowledge that cities such as Los Angeles report that in tech interview candidate pools women are underrepresented by 29%, but believe that women may self select themselves out of certain jobs. The lack of representation inhibits women from earning the same salaries within organizations because they are not hired at the same rate, and when they are hired are less likely to negotiate salary.

References

External links
 Why the Wage Gap for Tech Workers Goes Beyond Gender—Hired.com

Gender pay gap
Gender inequality in the United States